Posyolok imeni Dzerzhinskogo is a rural locality (a settlement) and the administrative center of Dzerzhinskoye Rural Settlement, Kashirsky District, Voronezh Oblast, Russia. The population was 1,838 as of 2010. There are 18 streets.

Geography 
The settlement is located 42 km northwest of Kashirskoye (the district's administrative centre) by road. Voronezhsky is the nearest rural locality.

References 

Rural localities in Kashirsky District, Voronezh Oblast